Hammesfahr is a German surname. Notable people with the surname include:

Hermann Hammesfahr (1845–1914), Prussian-American inventor
Petra Hammesfahr (born 1951), German writer
William Hammesfahr, American neurologist

German-language surnames